The TLA Players Championship was a men's golf tournament on the Tour de las Américas, the highest level professional golf tour in Latin America, held from 2002 to 2012. It was held at several different courses in the seaside resort of Acapulco in Mexico.

Since 2005, the tournament was played over 54 holes (3 rounds), having originally been contested over 72 holes (4 rounds).

Winners

External links
Tour de las Américas – official site

Golf tournaments in Mexico
Tour de las Américas events
Spring (season) events in Mexico